Escadrille 73 of the French Air Force originated at Corcieux on 23 May 1915 as Detachment N 49 during the World War I.

History
It was initially assigned to the VII Armee front. On 1 April 1916, it was renamed Detachment Nieuport de Corcieux. On 18 April 1916, it was redesignated, this time as Detachment N73. It became Escadrille N73 on 4 July 1916. On 1 November 1916, it was one of the units gathered into Groupe de Combat 12, along with Escadrille N3, Escadrille N26, and Escadrille N103. The unit became Escadrille Spa73 when it re-equipped with Spad VIIs in January 1917. The escadrille left GC 12 on 18 January 1918, being replaced by Escadrille SPA.67. On 4 October 1918, Escadrille Spa73 was cited in orders as having downed 30 enemy aircraft and an observation balloon.

Commanding officers
 Lieutenant Pierre Bouny
 Lieutenant Honore Lareinty-Tholozan: Killed in flying accident 5 May 1916
 Unknown
 Lieutenant Jean Ricard: 4 July 1916 -
 Capitaine Albert Deullin: 22 February 1917 - 8 February 1918
 Capitaine Pierre Cahuzac: ca 9 February 1918 - ca 2 March 1918
 Lieutenant Maurice Noguès: 3 March 1918 - April 1918
 Lieutenant Robert Gerdes: April 1918 - ca 9 July 1918
 Lieutenant Pierre Jaille: 10 July 1918 - ?

Notable personnel
 Capitaine Albert Deullin
 Lieutenant François Battesti

Aircraft

 Nieuport
 Nieuport 24
 Spad VII: Received January 1917

Endnotes

References 
 Franks, Norman; Frank W. Bailey. Over the Front: A Complete Record of the Fighter Aces and Units of the United States and French Air Services, 1914-1918 Grub Street, 1992. , .

Further reading 
 Bailey, Frank W., and Christophe Cony. French Air Service War Chronology, 1914-1918: Day-to-Day Claims and Losses by French Fighter, Bomber and Two-Seat Pilots on the Western Front. London: Grub Street, 2001.
 Davilla, James J., and Arthur M. Soltan. French Aircraft of the First World War. Stratford, CT: Flying Machines Press, 1997.
 Les escadrilles de l'aéronautique militaire française: symbolique et histoire, 1912-1920. Vincennes: Service historique de l'armée de l'air, 2004.

External links
Escadrille N 73 - SPA 73

French Air and Space Force squadrons